Mianabad (also Romanized as Mīānābād) is a village in Pirakuh Rural District, in the Central District of Jowayin County, Razavi Khorasan Province, Iran. At the 2006 census, its population was 101, in 37 families.

References 

Populated places in Joveyn County